Expo/Western station is an at-grade light rail station on the E Line of the Los Angeles Metro Rail system. The station is located in the center median of Exposition Boulevard at its intersection with Western Avenue, after which the station is named, in the West Adams neighborhood of Los Angeles.

History 
Originally a stop on the Los Angeles and Independence and Pacific Electric railroads, it closed on September 30, 1953, with the closure of the Santa Monica Air Line and remained out of service until re-opening on Saturday, April 28, 2012. It was completely rebuilt for the opening of the Expo Line from little more than a station stop marker. Regular scheduled service resumed Monday, April 30, 2012.

Service

Station layout 

The station has "far-side" platforms: this means that the platforms are positioned on opposite sides of the intersection, and trains always stop at the platform after crossing the intersection.

Hours and frequency

Connections 
, the following connections are available:
 Los Angeles Metro Bus: ,

Notable places nearby 
The station is within walking distance of the following notable places:
James A. Foshay Learning Center

Station artwork 
The station's art was created by artist Ronald J. Llanos.  Entitled Ephemeral Views: A Visual Essay, the installation depicts scenes of "the many characters who activate Los Angeles street life."

References 

E Line (Los Angeles Metro) stations
Railway stations in Los Angeles
Exposition Park (Los Angeles neighborhood)
Railway stations in the United States opened in 2012
2012 establishments in California
Pacific Electric stations